NGC 485, also commonly referred to as PGC 4921 or GC 270, is a spiral galaxy in the constellation Pisces. It is located approximately 86 million light-years from Earth and was discovered on January 8, 1828 by astronomer William Herschel. It was later also observed by Heinrich d'Arrest and Herman Schultz. When NGC 485 was originally categorized in the New General Catalogue by John Louis Eil Dreyer in 1888, it was incorrectly described as a "considerably faint, pretty large, round, 8th magnitude star 3 1/2 arcmin to southwest".

See also  
 Spiral galaxy 
 List of NGC objects (1–1000)
 Pisces (constellation)

References

External links 
 
 
 SEDS

Spiral galaxies
Pisces (constellation)
0485
4921
Astronomical objects discovered in 1828
Discoveries by William Herschel